The Temple of Venus Erycina was an ancient sanctuary on the in Ancient Rome, erected in 184 BC and dedicated to the goddess Venus.

History
The Temple of Venus Erycina on the Quirinal Hill was built by the consul Lucius Porcius Licinius.  He promised the temple to Venus in 184 BC during the war against the Ligurians in the north of Italy.  Porcius Licinius (or his younger brother) dedicated the shrine in 181 BC. The temple was possibly included in the 1st century BC in the complex of the Gardens of Sallust.  If still in use by the 4th-century, it would have been closed during the persecution of pagans in the late Roman Empire.

See also 
 Temple of Venus Erycina (Capitoline Hill)
List of Ancient Roman temples

References

Temples of Venus
Venus Erycina
2nd-century BC religious buildings and structures